Evan Sloane Richards (23 January 1862 – 19 April 1931) was a Welsh international rugby union forward who played club rugby for Swansea, captaining the club through three seasons during the 1880s. Richards' father was Member of Parliament for Ceredigion, Evan Matthew Richards.

Education
Richards was educated at Clifton College.

Rugby career 
Richards first came to prominence within rugby as a club player for Swansea. Before being selected to represent the Welsh team, he was made captain of Swansea in the 1883/84 season. The next season Richards was capped for Wales in the opening game of the 1885 Home Nations Championship against England. Captained by Newport's Charlie Newman, Wales lost the match by three tries and Richards lost his place for the next game.

Richards was again Swansea captain in the 1886/87 season, and was awarded his second and final Welsh cap in the Scottish game of the 1887 Home Nations Championship. Wales were beaten heavily in a one-sided game, and Richards lost his place to Edward Alexander. Richards would captain Swansea in the 1887/88 season, and during 1888, he refereed two matches in the New Zealand Māori's tour of Europe; the matches against Welsh clubs, Cardiff and Newport.

International games played
Wales
 1885
 1887

Bibliography

References 

1862 births
1931 deaths
People educated at Clifton College
Rugby union forwards
Rugby union players from Swansea
Swansea RFC players
Wales international rugby union players
Welsh rugby union players
Welsh rugby union referees